The National Association of City Transportation Officials (NACTO) is a coalition of the Departments of Transportation in North American cities.

Founded in 1996, NACTO has participated in a number of research initiatives dealing with surface transportation in urban areas. Past campaigns have focused on bicycling, bus rapid transit, light rail, bike share, and freight. Its design guides have gained the endorsement of numerous cities, states, and other organizations, in addition to gaining FHWA acceptance for use in conjunction with other mandated guidance and resources. NACTO is headquartered in New York City.

Designing Cities Conference 
Since 2012, NACTO has held an annual Designing Cities Conference, convening hundreds of "transportation leaders and practitioners from across the country to discuss key trends in urban street design and transportation policy."

Conference sites
2012: New York City 
2013: Phoenix
2014: San Francisco
2015: Austin
2016: Seattle
2017: Chicago
2018: Los Angeles
2019: Toronto
2022: Boston (postponed from 2020)
2023: Denver

Global Designing Cities 
In October 2014, the Global Designing Cities Initiative was launched as a subsidiary of NACTO to bring guidance for safe streets to an international audience. It focuses on the critical role of streets within urban environments in cities around the world. The Initiative was announced at NACTO's 2014 Designing Cities Conference in San Francisco.

The initiative will work especially close with the 10 cities chosen to be a focus of the Bloomberg Initiative for Global Road Safety: Accra, Addis Ababa, Bandung, Bangkok, Bogota, Fortaleza, Ho Chi Minh City, Mumbai, Sao Paulo, and Shanghai.

Bike Share 
The NACTO Bike Share initiative aims to strengthen bike sharing programs in its member cities, with a focus on improving social equity impact and reaching underrepresented groups. The Bike Share initiative provides bike share program managers and cities with best-practices research as well as a forum to exchange knowledge.

Design Guides 
NACTO's Design Guides provide innovative street design guidelines, made specifically for urban settings.

Urban Bikeway Design Guide 

In March 2011 the NACTO Urban Bikeway Design Guide, part of the Cities for Cycling initiative, was officially released. Janette Sadik-Khan, the New York City Department of Transportation Commissioner, announced the release at the National Bike Summit in Washington, D.C. The Bikeway Design Guide provides technical guidance on over twenty different bicycle infrastructure designs. These include buffered bike lanes, cycle tracks, advanced stop line (bike boxes), and several other treatments which have not been officially adopted into AASHTO or MUTCD manuals. Many of these designs have already been implemented in cities across the United States and are widely used in Europe and Canada. Bicycle facilities from New York City and Portland, Oregon, are heavily featured in the guide, though case studies from cities all throughout the United States are represented as well. A second edition was released in 2014.

Transit Street Design Guide 
The NACTO Transit Street Design Guide, showcasing how to improve transit using innovative street design, was published in April 2015.

Membership
Membership is open to cities in the US, Canada, and Mexico. Full member cities must have more than 400,000 residents or be the core city in a metropolitan statistical area with at least 2 million people. Affiliate membership is offered to cities with fewer than 400,000 residents.

In 2013, NACTO began an international membership, which five cities are members of as of 2019. This uses slightly different metrics: A minimum of 900,000 city population or metropolitan area of at least 2 million for full membership; and a minimum of requiring a minimum of 300,000 for affiliate membership.

NACTO bylaws also offer affiliate membership to cities with more than 300,000 residents that are secondary cities in an MSA with a larger core city (e.g. Oakland, where San Francisco is the core city in its MSA).

In 2015, NACTO began offering affiliate membership for transit agencies. As of May 2019, there are 25 member cities, 41 Affiliate member cities, 11 transit agency members and 5 international members.

Member Cities

 Atlanta, Georgia
 Austin, Texas
 Baltimore, Maryland
 Boston, Massachusetts
 Charlotte, North Carolina
 Chicago, Illinois
 Columbus, Ohio
 Dallas, Texas
 Denver, Colorado
 Detroit, Michigan
 Houston, Texas
 Los Angeles, California
 Minneapolis, Minnesota
 New York City
 Orlando, Florida
 Philadelphia, Pennsylvania
 Phoenix, Arizona
 Pittsburgh, Pennsylvania
 Portland, Oregon
 Sacramento, California
 San Antonio, Texas
 San Francisco, California
 San Jose, California
 Seattle, Washington
 Washington DC

Affiliate Member Cities

 Alexandria, Virginia
 Arlington, Virginia
 Bellevue, Washington
 Boulder, Colorado
 Burlington, Vermont
 Cambridge, Massachusetts
 Charleston, South Carolina
 Cincinnati, Ohio
 Cupertino, California
 El Paso, Texas
 Fort Collins, Colorado
 Fort Lauderdale, Florida
 Grand Rapids, Michigan
 Harrisburg, Pennsylvania
 Hoboken, New Jersey
 Honolulu, Hawaii
 Indianapolis, Indiana
 Long Beach, California
 Louisville, Kentucky
 Madison, Wisconsin
 Memphis, Tennessee
 Miami Beach, Florida
 Nashville, Tennessee
 New Haven, Connecticut
 New Orleans, Louisiana
 Oakland, California
 Palo Alto, California
 Pasadena, California
 Raleigh, North Carolina
 Salt Lake City, Utah
 San Luis Obispo, California
 Santa Monica, California
 Somerville, Massachusetts
 St. Louis, Missouri
 Tampa, Florida
 Tucson, Arizona
 Vancouver, Washington
 Ventura, California
 West Hollywood, California
 West Palm Beach, Florida

Transit Agency Members

 Charleston Area Regional Transportation Authority
 Chicago Transit Authority
 Metropolitan Transit Authority of Harris County (Houston, TX)
 King County Metro (Seattle, WA)
 Los Angeles County Metropolitan Transportation Authority
 Metro Transit (Minneapolis–Saint Paul, MN)
 Miami-Dade Transit (Miami, FL)
 Metropolitan Transportation Authority (New York City)
 TriMet (Portland, OR)
 Translink (Vancouver, BC, Canada)
 VIA Metropolitan Transit (San Antonio, TX)

International Members

 Halifax (Nova Scotia, Canada)
 Hamilton (Ontario, Canada)
 Montréal (Quebec, Canada)
 Toronto (Ontario, Canada)
 Vancouver (British Columbia, Canada)
 Calgary (Alberta, Canada)

Leadership 
NACTO's executive board is made up of four elected full Member representatives, one Affiliate Member representative, and the Chair of the Strategic Advisory Board. The executive board is elected by NACTO member city representatives.

See also
 American Association of State Highway and Transportation Officials
 Adventure Cycling Association
 Bikeway safety
 Cycling infrastructure
 History of cycling infrastructure
 National cycling route network
 United States Bicycle Route System

References

Transportation in the United States
1996 establishments in the United States
Bicycle transportation planning